Huidong County is a county of southeastern Guangdong province, People's Republic of China, with some South China Sea coast in the south of the county. It is under the administration of Huizhou City.

Administrative divisions 
The county is responsible for the administration of one subdistrict and 13 towns.

Pingshan Subdistrict
Pingshan Subdistrict is an area where people came to trade 40 years ago, now it is still functioning for this reason. And also because of historical reason, a road connecting Guangzhou to Shangtou was built like at least 30 years ago, the road was responsible for transportation the cargo from Guangzhou to Shangtou or vice versa, and due to this, drivers can take a rest in the middle of this long journey in Pingshan. They can have sleep in the automobile hotel, they can supply water to automobile engine, change the tires, etc. In those days, Pingshan is majorly growing foods, people from those time can trade their raw foods with whatever they need from the cargo buses. 
This area is near the Pacific Ocean, the climate feature to subtropical climate. Winds or storm come from ocean in the summer, sometimes it is very strong, if people live in this condition, they will not last for a long time, but thanks to god, there is mountain lying from east to west, and it can weaken the storm if there is such, so people can live peacefully and can have generations. We always say, water is the source of life. And indeed, if there is no water in the area, there will be no people or plant, and all of this living things should thank to the mountain.

Transportation
There is a bus service from Huidong County to Shenzhen Bao'an International Airport in Shenzhen.

Climate

See also
Renping Peninsula

References

External links 
 

 
County-level divisions of Guangdong
Huizhou